The Our Lady of Lourdes Cathedral or simply Cathedral of Daegu, is a religious building belonging to the Catholic Church and is located in Daegu part of North Gyeongsang Province, South Korea.

It is a temple that follows the Roman or Latin rite and functions as the headquarters of the Metropolitan Archdiocese of Daegu (Archidioecesis Taeguensis or 천주교 대구대교구) which was created in 1962 by bull "Fertile Evangelii semen" by the Pope John XXIII.

The present building was built between 1902 and 1903 and remodeled when it was elevated to cathedral status in 1911. Pope John Paul II visited the temple in May 1984.

The original structure was made of wood but it burnt down in 1899.

See also
Roman Catholicism in South Korea
Our Lady of Lourdes

References

Roman Catholic cathedrals in South Korea
Buildings and structures in Daegu
Roman Catholic churches completed in 1903
20th-century Roman Catholic church buildings in South Korea